Neoregelia laevis is a species of flowering plant in the genus Neoregelia. This species is endemic to Brazil.

Cultivars
 Neoregelia 'Laebee'
 Neoregelia 'Rafael'
 Neoregelia 'Wild Fire'

References

BSI Cultivar Registry Retrieved 11 October 2009

laevis
Flora of Brazil